The National Front of Catalonia (FNC) is a Catalan conservative and pro-independence political party, presented in 2013. It had a local councilor in Ripoll between 2019 and 2020. Their main ideological principles are Catalan nationalism and opposition to irregular immigration.

History

Foundation 
The party was registered in 1999 with the same name as the National Front of Catalonia, which had dissolved in 1990. In 2013 Jordi Casacubera i Pérez, Pere Soler i Montoliu, Miquel Àngel Rodríguez i Fernàndez and Moisès Font i Casademont publicly launched the party. Jordi Casacuberta had been a member of the National Front of Catalonia, Catalan State, Republican Left of Catalonia,  and Reagrupament. Pere Soler and Miquel Àngel Rodríguez had been members of the Democratic Union of Catalonia, and Moisès Font had been councilor of Platform for Catalonia in Olot and territorial president of PxC in Girona.

Former members of the original FNC made a statement saying that when they had dissolved the FNC in 1990, they had approved in the last General Assembly that no-one would use the name in future, and that the ideology defended by the new FNC was different from the progressivism that the original FNC stood for. On June 27, 2014, Jordi Casacuberta i Pere Soler re-introduced the party with the name of National Democratic Bloc in Girona. They were defined as social conservatives and republicans.

They wanted to present tenths of lists for the 2015 local elections, but finally they didn't do so. The party announced they would not participate in Catalan regional elections before independence in order to avoid dividing the vote.

2019 local elections 
In the 2019 local elections, the party presented a list in Ripoll, with the same name as the National Front of Catalonia, dissolved in 1990. The first on the list was Sílvia Orriols Serra and the second candidate was Fina Guix, who had been a councillor for Convergència i Unió in the previous legislature. Alternative for Ripoll, the Republican Left of Catalonia, Together for Catalonia and the Socialists' Party of Catalonia pledged not to negotiate or work with the other two candidates from the FNC and Som Catalans, because they believed they were racist. The FNC denied this allegation. The party obtained 503 votes (9.44%) and Sílvia Orriols Serra was elected as a councillor.

During the 2020 coronavirus pandemic, Sílvia Orriols left the FNC because of differences with the party on how to «face the serious national situation and the problem of immigration». As she continued to be councillor, the FNC was left without representation.

Electoral performance

Parliament of Catalonia

References

External links 
 

1999 establishments in Catalonia
Political parties in Catalonia
Catalan nationalist parties
Right-wing populism in Spain
Far-right politics in Catalonia
Far-right political parties in Spain